The Intermontane Trench was an ancient oceanic trench during the Triassic. The ocean that the trench was located in was called the Slide Mountain Ocean.

See also 
Intermontane Islands
Intermontane Plate

External links
Burke Museum - University of Washington

Historical geology
Oceanic trenches of the Pacific Ocean
Triassic paleogeography
Landforms of North America
Subduction zones